Yohan Bilingi (born 1 February 1999) is a French professional footballer who plays as a defender for Championnat National club Dunkerque.

Club career
Bilingi is a former youth academy player of Cannes. After graduating through academy of Guingamp, he joined Bastia-Borgo on loan in September 2019. On 31 May 2020, Concarneau announced the signing of Bilingi on a season long loan deal.

Following his return to Guingamp after two consecutive loan spells, Bilingi made his professional debut on 24 July 2021 in a goalless draw against Le Havre.

On 3 June 2022, Bilingi agreed to join Dunkerque for the 2022–23 season.

International career
Bilingi is a former French youth national team player. He has played two matches for under-19 team in 2017.

Personal life
Bilingi is of Congolese descent.

References

External links
 
 

1999 births
Living people
French sportspeople of Democratic Republic of the Congo descent
Black French sportspeople
Association football defenders
French footballers
France youth international footballers
Ligue 2 players
Championnat National players
Championnat National 2 players
Championnat National 3 players
En Avant Guingamp players
FC Bastia-Borgo players
US Concarneau players
USL Dunkerque players
People from Alfortville
Footballers from Val-de-Marne